The National Lacrosse Association was a professional box lacrosse league that operated in 1968-1969 with teams from both the United States and Canada.

Due to poor attendance, the league folded in March 1969. After the folding, two teams (the Maple Leafs and Peterborough Lakers) joined the ill-fated Eastern Professional Lacrosse League which went defunct after one season. The NLA was the first attempt at a professional box lacrosse league in history. After cessation in 1969, the next popular pro lacrosse league would be the National Lacrosse League (1974-75).

History
The National Lacrosse Association was founded in 1968 by entrepreneurs looking to capitalize on the game's exciting aspects. Most of the teams in the NLA were amateur-level teams from Canada that decided to make their teams professional. 

Some organizations drew considerable crowds and had games televised while other teams struggled to bring in even a couple hundred fans. Players' salaries averaged between $3000 and $4000 per year. 

In the league's one and only season, The New Westminster Salmonbellies emerged as the champions by beating the Detroit Olympics four games to two.

Teams
EASTERN DIVISION
 Detroit Olympics
 Montreal Canadians
 Peterborough Lakers
 Toronto Maple Leafs
WESTERN DIVISION
 New Westminster Salmonbellies
 Portland Adanacs
 Vancouver Carlings
 Victoria Shamrocks

1968 season

Source

Playoffs

References

Lacrosse leagues in Canada
Lacrosse leagues in the United States
Professional sports leagues in Canada
Professional sports leagues in the United States
1968 establishments in North America
1969 disestablishments in North America
Sports leagues established in 1968
Sports leagues disestablished in 1969